Renaud Muselier (born 6 May 1959) is a French physician and politician who has served as President of the Regional Council of Provence-Alpes-Côte d'Azur since 2017. A former member of The Republicans (LR), he previously was a Member of the European Parliament (MEP) from 2014 to 2019.

Early life and education 
A native of Marseille, Muselier is the grandson of Admiral Émile Muselier. He is the nephew of the Queen Geraldine of Albania (née Countess Apponyi de Nagy-Apponyi), wife of the last King of Albania, Zog I, deposed by the Italians in 1939.

Political career
Muselier was the member of the General Council of Bouches-du-Rhône for the canton of Marseille – Notre-Dame-du-Mont from 1992 to 1995, as well as a member of the Regional Council of Provence-Alpes-Côte d'Azur from 2004 to 2007. He was Deputy Mayor of Marseille from 1995 to 2008 under the mayorship of Jean-Claude Gaudin.

Early career in national politics
Muselier was a member of the National Assembly of France for the 5th constituency of Bouches-du-Rhône from 1993 to 2002. During that time, her served on the Committee on Cultural Affairs. 

From 2002 to 2005, Muselier served as Secretary of State for Foreign Affairs, under the leadership of successive ministers Dominique de Villepin and Michel Barnier.

Following the 2007 legislative election, Muselier re-joined the National Assembly, serving on its Committee on Foreign Affairs from 2007 to 2012. 

Muselier was reelected of the Regional Council of Provence-Alpes-Côte d'Azur in 2015 and became its first vice-president under the presidency of Christian Estrosi.

Member of the European Parliament, 2014–2019
Muselier became a Member of the European Parliament following the 2014 European election. Throughout his term, he served on the Committee on Transport and Tourism. In addition to his committee assignments, he was a member of the Parliament's delegation to the ACP–EU Joint Parliamentary Assembly.

In the 2016 The Republicans presidential primary, Muselier endorsed Nicolas Sarkozy as the party's candidate for the office of President of France.

Regional Council of Provence-Alpes-Côte d’Azur, 2017–present
On 29 May 2017, Muselier was elected President of the Regional Council of Provence-Alpes-Côte d'Azur, succeeding Christian Estrosi, who returned as Mayor of Nice.

Muselier announced his intention to run for reelection on a joint ticket with La République En Marche! (LREM) in 2021, under an agreement brokered by Prime Minister Jean Castex. However, this led to the resignation of Nice Mayor Christian Estrosi and Toulon Mayor Hubert Falco from The Republicans a few days later. LREM politician Sophie Cluzel subsequently announced she would lead a list herself, thus terminating the joint ticket agreement, before backtracking and announcing the agreement would be upheld. Muselier ultimately got 57.3 percent of the vote, against 42.7 percent for National Rally candidate Thierry Mariani.

Ahead of the 2022 presidential elections, Muselier publicly declared his support for Xavier Bertrand as the Republicans’ candidate. Shortly after, he announced his decision to leave the Republicans, accusing fellow party member Eric Ciotti of "conveying the ideas of Éric Zemmour within LR".

Other activities
 Associations Pensons le Grand Marseille et Cap sur l'Avenir, President
 Chorégies d'Orange, Member of the Board of Directors
 Fondation Philippe Daher, Member of the Board of Directors
 French Development Agency (AFD), Member of the Board of Directors
 Institut du Monde Arabe (IMA), Chairman of the Board of Trustees (since 2011)
 Rencontres d'Arles, Honorary Member of the Board of Directors

References

1959 births
Living people
20th-century French politicians
21st-century French politicians
Physicians from Marseille
Rally for the Republic politicians
Union for a Popular Movement politicians
The Republicans (France) politicians
Deputies of the 10th National Assembly of the French Fifth Republic
Deputies of the 12th National Assembly of the French Fifth Republic
Deputies of the 11th National Assembly of the French Fifth Republic
Deputies of the 13th National Assembly of the French Fifth Republic
The Republicans (France) MEPs
MEPs for South-East France 2014–2019
20th-century French physicians
Secretaries of State of France
Departmental councillors (France)
Members of the Regional Council of Provence-Alpes-Côte d'Azur
Presidents of the Regional Council of Provence-Alpes-Côte d'Azur
French city councillors